The On Every Street Tour was the final concert tour by British rock band Dire Straits, supporting their sixth and final album, On Every Street. It lasted from 23 August 1991 to 9 October 1992, and included 229 shows in 19 countries throughout Europe, North America, Australia and New Zealand. The world tour sold 7.1 million tickets.

The tour lineup included Mark Knopfler (guitar, vocals), John Illsley (bass), Guy Fletcher (keyboards), Alan Clark (keyboards), Chris White (saxophone, flute), Paul Franklin (pedal steel guitar), Danny Cummings (percussion), Phil Palmer (guitar), and Chris Whitten (drums).

"The last tour was utter misery," said manager Ed Bicknell. "Whatever the zeitgeist was that we had been part of, it had passed." "Personal relationships were in trouble and it put a terrible strain on everybody, emotionally and physically," agreed Illsley. "We were changed by it."

Concerts in Nîmes, France and Rotterdam, The Netherlands were recorded in May 1992 and released in 1993 on the live LP, On The Night.

Tour dates

Setlist
Core songs
 "Calling Elvis"
 "Walk of Life"
 "Heavy Fuel"
 "Romeo and Juliet"
 "The Bug"
 "Private Investigations"
 "Sultans of Swing"
 "Your Latest Trick"
 "On Every Street"
 "Two Young Lovers"
 "Telegraph Road"
 "Money for Nothing"
 "Brothers in Arms"
 "Solid Rock"
 "Wild Theme"

Additional songs
 "Tunnel of Love"
 "Planet of New Orleans"
 "I Think I Love You Too Much"
 "Iron Hand"
 "You and Your Friend"
 "Fade to Black"
 "Setting Me Up"
 "Long Highway"
 "Portobello Belle"
 "Why Worry"
 "When It Comes to You"
 "So Far Away"

References

1991 concert tours
1992 concert tours
Dire Straits concert tours